Myotubularin-related protein 2 also known as phosphatidylinositol-3,5-bisphosphate 3-phosphatase or phosphatidylinositol-3-phosphate phosphatase is a protein that in humans is encoded by the MTMR2 gene.

Function 

This gene is a member of the myotubularin family and encodes a putative tyrosine phosphatase.  The protein also contains a GRAM domain.  Mutations in this gene are a cause of Charcot-Marie-Tooth disease type 4B, an autosomal recessive demyelinating neuropathy. Multiple alternatively spliced transcript variants have been found, but the biological validity of some variants has not been determined.

Interactions 

MTMR2 has been shown to interact with SBF1.

References

Further reading

External links 
  GeneReviews/NCBI/NIH/UW entry on Charcot-Marie-Tooth Neuropathy Type 4